"Anyone for tennis?" (also "Tennis, anyone?") is an English-language idiom. Other uses include: 

"Anyone for Tennis", a song by the British rock band Cream
Anyone For Tennis?, an Australian comedy band
"Tennis, Anyone?", an episode of the American television situation comedy The Jeffersons
"Tennis Anyone?", an episode of the British television situation comedy Kim's Convenience

See also
Anyone for Denis? (disambiguation)
Anyone for Tennyson?
Tennis